Naeem Sayyed (born 15 November 1956) popularly known as Mehmood Junior is an Indian actor, singer and Marathi film director. The name Junior Mehmood was given to him by Mehmood Ali.

Career
Mehmood Junior has acted in 265 movies in 7 different languages and also has produced and directed 6 Marathi movies.

Selected filmography

 Naunihal (1967)
 Mohabbat Zindagi Hai (1966 film)
 Vaasna (1968)
 Sunghursh (1968)
 Suhaag Raat (1968)
 Parivar (1968)
 Farishta (1968)
 Brahmachari (1968/I)
 Vishwas (1969)
 Simla Road (1969)
 Raja Saab (1969)
 Pyar Hi Pyar (1969)
 Nateeja (1969)
 Chanda Aur Bijli (1969)
 Balak (1969)
 Anjaana (1969)
 Do Raaste (1969)
 Yaadgaar (1970)
 Kati Patang (1970)
 Ghar Ghar Ki Kahani (1970)
 Bachpan (1970)
 Aan Milo Sajna (1970)
 Ustad Pedro (1971)
 Ramu Ustad (1971)
 Ladki Pasand Hai (1971)
 Johar Mehmood in Hong Kong (1971)
 Caravan (1971)
 Haathi Mere Saathi (1971)
 Chhoti Bahu (1971)
 Chingari (1971)
 Hungama (1971)
"Khoj" (1971)
 Haré Raama Haré Krishna (1971)      
 [Bhaiti]-1972(Assamese)
 Maa Da Laadla (1973) as shotu in Punjabi movie 
 Aap Ki Kasam (1974)
 Amir Garib (1974)
 Teri Meri Ik Jindri (1975) as Latoo in Punjabi Movie 
 Romeo in Sikkam (1975)
 Aap Beati (1976)
 Geet Gaata Chal (1975)
 Aap To Aise Na The (1980)
 Farz Aur Pyar (1981)
 Apna Bana Lo (1982)
 Lovers (1983)
 Phulwari (1984)
 Karishma Kudrat Kaa (1985)
 Sadaa Suhagan (1986)
 Bistar (1986)
 Sasti Dulhan Mahenga Dulha (1986)
 Khel Mohabbat Ka (1986)
 Pati Paisa Aur Pyar (1987)
 Dadagiri (1987)
 Imaandaar (1987)
 Main Tere Liye (1988)
 Akhri Muqabla (1988)
 Mohabbat Ke Dushman (1988)
 Aag Ke Sholay (1988)
 Jaisi Karni Waisi Bharni (1989)
 Shehzaade (1989)
 Pyar Ka Karz (1990)
 Jawani Zindabad (1990)
 Baap Numbri Beta Dus Numbri (1990)
 Kasam Dhande Ki (1990)
 Aaj Ka Arjun (1990)
 Vasna (1991)
 Numbri Aadmi (1991)
 Khoon Ka Karz (1991)
 Karz Chukana Hai (1991)
 Ramgarh Ke Sholay (1991)
 Pyar Hua Chori Chori (1992)
 Daulat Ki Jung (1992)
 Gurudev (1993)
 Dharam Ka Insaaf (1993)
 Chauraha (1994)
 Bewafa Sanam (1995)
 Aazmayish (1995)
 Apne Dam Par (1996)
 Mafia (1996)
 Chhote Sarkar (1996)
 Judaai (1997)
 Mahaanta (1997)
 Aakhir Kaun Thi Woh (2000)
 Adla Badli (2008)
 Qatil Haseeno Ka (2001)
 Raat Ke Saudagar (2002)
 Yeh Kaisi Mohabbat (2002)
 Chalo Ishq Ladaayem (2002)
 Humein Tumse Pyar Ho Gaya Chupke Chupke (2003)
 Journey Bombay to Goa (2007)
 Jaana Pehchana (2011)
 Pyaar Ka Dard Hai Meetha Meetha Pyaara Pyaara serial on Star Plus (2012–) as Shanky
 Ek Rishta Saajhedari ka (TV serial 2016–) on Sony SET.
 Tenali Rama TV Serial on SAB TV(2019) as Mulla Nasiruddin

References

External links
 
 

Living people
Male actors in Hindi cinema
1956 births
Male actors from Mumbai
Marathi film directors
20th-century Indian male actors
21st-century Indian male actors
Male actors in Hindi television